A rector of a Dutch university is called a rector magnificus. The following people have been rector magnificus of the Maastricht University:

External links 
 Maastricht University

Lists of office-holders in the Netherlands
Science-related lists
Maastricht University
 
 
Lists of Dutch people by occupation